Lake Bosumtwi is the only natural lake in Ghana. There are about 30 villages near the crater lake of Lake Bosumtwi, with a combined population of about 70,000. The most popular amongst the villages where tourists usually settle is Abono.

The Ashanti consider Bosumtwi a sacred lake. According to traditional belief, the souls of the dead come here to bid farewell to the goddess Asase Ya. Because of this, it is considered permissible to fish in the lake only from wooden planks. Among the fish species in the lake is the endemic cichlid Hemichromis frempongi, and the near-endemic cichlids Tilapia busumana and T. discolor.

Impact crater 

The crater has been partly eroded, and is situated in dense rainforest, making it difficult to study and confirm its origin by meteorite impact. Shock features such as shatter cones are largely overgrown by vegetation or covered by the lake. However, drilling of the crater's central uplift beneath the lake floor has recently provided an abundance of shocked materials for scientific study. Tektites, believed to be from this impact, are found in the neighbouring country of Ivory Coast, and related microtektites have been found in deep sea sediments west of the African continent.

A work based on a statistical study of past numerical orbital simulations of the impact event asserts that the possible origin of the impactor is an asteroid coming from the middle main-belt at a high inclination (>17 degrees).

Climate history 
Before the asteroid impact, the area was a lush rainforest filled with animals. Following the impact, the resulting crater filled with water forming Lake Bosumtwi.

Periods of heavy rainfall filled the crater with water, causing the lake level to rise above the lowest points of the rim. Such periods are evidenced from fossils of fish found on hilltops. Water even flowed from the basin through an overflow channel. However, there were also times when the water level was so low that the rainforest entered the basin rendering the lake only a small pond. Such a period, according to legend and now proved by paleoclimate records, lasted until about 300 years ago.

Human history 

The legends say that in 1648 an Ashanti hunter named Akora Bompe from the city of Asaman was chasing an injured antelope through the rainforest. Suddenly, the animal disappeared in a small pond. It was as if this body of water wanted to save the animal's life. The hunter never got the antelope, though he settled close to the water and started catching fish. This place he named "Bosomtwe", meaning "antelope god". This story suggests that at that time the lake level was very low. The large dead trees standing offshore in the lake also evidence this, for they are over 300 years old.

The following centuries saw several wars about the lake as both the Ashanti and the Akim clashed, each claiming the area. The Ashanti prevailed. Each village in the lake area has its own shrine or fetish grove. With the arrival of Christianity, some of people gave up former beliefs, though many continue to seek traditional help in bad times or against diseases.

The Abrodwum Stone is held to be the spiritual centre of the lake. Here, when there is such poor fishing it is considered a bad omen, the lake people  sacrifice a cow. This act is celebrated in the presence of the Ashanti king, the Asantehene. In the ceremony, the cow's innards are given to the stone and the rest is thrown into the lake. The crowd rushes into the water with cutlasses and axes to take their share of the meat.

There is a traditional taboo against touching the water with iron and modern boats are not considered appropriate. The padua, a wooden plank requiring considerable skill to maneuver, is the legitimate method. Other taboos such as not washing, bathing or throwing effluents into the Lake that were formerly strictly observed, aided in maintaining the purity and health of the Lake. However, these taboos are not observed by residents or visitors due to their weak implementation by the Abono Traditional Council.

There are current environmental concerns, including overfishing and inadequate farming methods.
The growing population increased demand for fish. Excessive fishing led to steadily decreasing catches, forcing increased reliance on agriculture. As more and more of the hills are converted into farmland, exposing the surface to the heavy rainfalls, soil erosion becomes an ever-greater problem.
In addition there is the changing lake level. Many villages have been submerged several times forcing the people to move up the slopes or outside the basin. That is the origin of such double names as Pipie No.1 and Pipie No.2.

The lake is a popular resort area with local people for swimming, fishing and boat trips. The lakeside village of Amakom has a small hospital with a doctor residing on premise, called Lake Bosumtwi Methodist Clinic, providing emergency services by boat and 4x4 ambulance.

See also
Lake Iro – another African lake suspected to be an impact crater

References

External links 
 Lake Bosomtwe Ecotourism Map and Guide (notice: "Bosomtwe" is the correct spelling according to Kumasi University)
 Lake Bosomtwe Drilling Project

Ancient lakes
Ashanti Region
Impact crater lakes
Lakes of Ghana
Impact craters of Ghana
Pleistocene impact craters
Sacred lakes